Alex Gergo Szőke (born 3 March 2000) is a Hungarian Greco-Roman wrestler. He won the silver medal in the 97 kg event at the 2021 World Wrestling Championships held in Oslo, Norway. He also represented Hungary at the 2020 Summer Olympics in Tokyo, Japan.

Career 

In February 2020, he competed in the 97 kg event at the European Wrestling Championships in Rome, Italy. In December 2020, he won the silver medal in the 97 kg event at the Individual Wrestling World Cup held in Belgrade, Serbia.

In March 2021, he competed at the European Qualification Tournament in Budapest, Hungary hoping to qualify for the 2020 Summer Olympics in Tokyo, Japan. He did not qualify at this tournament but, in May 2021, he was able to qualify for the Olympics at the World Olympic Qualification Tournament held in Sofia, Bulgaria. At the Olympics, he lost his bronze medal match against Tadeusz Michalik of Poland in the men's 97 kg event.

In 2022, he won one of the bronze medals in his event at the Matteo Pellicone Ranking Series held in Rome, Italy. He competed in the 97kg event at the 2022 World Wrestling Championships held in Belgrade, Serbia.

Achievements

References

External links 

 

Living people
Place of birth missing (living people)
Hungarian male sport wrestlers
Wrestlers at the 2020 Summer Olympics
Olympic wrestlers of Hungary
2000 births
World Wrestling Championships medalists
21st-century Hungarian people